Jaimini Bhagwati is an Indian author, columnist and former Indian Foreign Service officer who served as the High Commissioner of India to the United Kingdom.

Currently he is the RBI Chair Professor at the Indian Council for Research on International Economic Relations, New Delhi.

Early life and education 
Bhagwati studied physics at the St. Stephen's College and later completed a master's degree at the Massachusetts Institute of Technology. He also completed his PhD from Tufts University.

Positions held
Ambassador to Belgium, Luxembourg and the European Union  2008-2012.

Diplomatic career
He is a 1976  batch officer of the Indian Foreign Service.

High Commission of India to the United Kingdom

External links
 Ministry of External Affairs, Government of India

References

High Commissioners of India to the United Kingdom
Indian Foreign Service officers
Year of birth missing (living people)
Living people